A total of 21 buildings and other structures in the English civil parish of Dodcott cum Wilkesley have been officially designated as listed buildings for their "special architectural and historic interest". Dodcott cum Wilkesley is in the Cheshire East division of the ceremonial county of Cheshire, situated on the Cheshire Plain at the border with Shropshire. The civil parish is predominantly rural, with many scattered minor settlements, the largest of which is the small village of Burleydam. One of the listed buildings is classified by English Heritage as being in grade I, meaning "of exceptional interest, sometimes considered to be internationally important" (this grade accounts for only 2.5% of all listed buildings); two are in grade II* and the remainder in grade II.

Combermere Abbey, the remains of a former Cistercian monastery founded in 1133, is listed at grade I. Richly endowed at foundation, its lands included the manor of Wilkesley, the villages of Dodcott, Lodmore and Royal, land at Burleydam, and woods at Butterley Heyes. After its dissolution in 1538, the abbey was granted to Sir George Cotton, who converted part of the abbey buildings into a country house, demolishing the remainder. The estate remained in the Cotton family, later the Viscounts Combermere, until 1919. Little remains of the medieval monastic buildings; remnants of medieval stonework from an arch are concealed in a cupboard in the house, and a sundial in the park is believed to incorporate part of a 12th-century column. The existing house incorporates a building generally considered to represent the Abbot's House, part of whose timbers have recently been dated to around 1502. Its timber-framed structure was hidden under a Gothic remodelling of around 1814–21, in which cement render, castellations and windows with pointed arches were added. Combermere Park occupies a substantial area in the west of the civil parish and contains almost half of the parish's listed buildings and structures. The other listed buildings and structures within the park date from the 18th and 19th centuries; many also have Gothic features. Unusual structures include a grade-II*-listed game larder, an icehouse, a folly incorporating dog kennels, a battlemented water tower and a clock tower.

St Michael's Church and its gates and railings in Burleydam are also associated with the Cotton family. Three listed buildings are clustered in the small settlement of Royal's Green, two in the hamlet of Wilkesley, and others in the hamlets of Barnett Brook and Grindley Green. The five half-timbered "black and white" cottages and farm buildings to have listed status all date from the 17th century; this century accounts for half of the timber-framed buildings in Cheshire. The earliest is believed to be Butterley Heyes, an early 17th-century farmhouse which is one of the parish's grade-II*-listed buildings. The earliest brick building, Wilkesley Farmhouse, also dates from the 17th century, and brick predominates as a building material in the listed buildings dating from the 18th and 19th centuries. Several structures are built in sandstone, including Stone Lodge, an early 19th-century gate lodge to the abbey.

Listed buildings and structures

See also
Listed buildings in Audlem
Listed buildings in Newhall
Listed buildings in Wrenbury cum Frith
Listed buildings in Marbury cum Quoisley
Listed buildings in Whitchurch Urban, Shropshire
Listed buildings in Whitchurch Rural, Shropshire
Listed buildings in Ightfield, Shropshire
Listed buildings in Adderley, Shropshire

Notes and references

Sources
de Figueiredo P, Treuherz J. Cheshire Country Houses (Phillimore; 1988)
Driver JT. Cheshire in the Later Middle Ages.  A History of Cheshire, Vol. 6 (Series Editor: JJ Bagley), (Cheshire Community Council; 1971)
Hartwell C, Hyde M, Hubbard E, Pevsner N. The Buildings of England: Cheshire (2nd edn) (Yale University Press; 2011)
Husain BMC. Cheshire under the Norman Earls: 1066–1237. A History of Cheshire, Vol. 4 (Series Editor: JJ Bagley) (Cheshire Community Council; 1973)
Local History Group, Latham FA (ed.). Wrenbury and Marbury (The Local History Group; 1999)
McKenna L. Timber Framed Buildings in Cheshire (Cheshire County Council; 1994)

Listed buildings in the Borough of Cheshire East
Lists of listed buildings in Cheshire